Robert Frank Flider (born October 22, 1957) is a former Democratic member of the Illinois House of Representatives.

Early life
Robert Frank Flider was born October 22, 1957 in Chicago, Illinois. He attended Bogan High School in Chicago from 1971-73. His family moved to Mattoon, Illinois in 1973, and he graduated from Mattoon High School in 1975. He then attended the nearby Eastern Illinois University where he graduated in 1979 with a Bachelor of Arts degree in journalism. After college, he began work as a newspaper reporter in the Charleston–Mattoon region before being employed by the electric and gas industry, including time as the Director of Regulatory Affairs at Illinois Power. He served as Project Manager of Illinois Power's regulatory reform initiative, which led to the state legislature's passage of Energy Choice 2000.

In 1991, Flider was elected to the Mt. Zion City Village Board where he served for one term before being elected the Mayor of Mt. Zion in 1995. During his two terms as mayor, he was involved as a board member for the Economic Development Corporation of Decatur and Macon County, the Downtown Decatur Council, Decatur Rotary Club, United Way of Decatur and Macon County and Seniorama Committee. In that same period he also earned a Certificate of Business Administration from the University of Illinois and attended the Harvard Law School Program on Negotiation (1997).

Illinois House of Representatives
On January 16, 2003, Democratic incumbent Julie Curry resigned to take a position in the administration of Governor Rod Blagojevich. Two days later, the Democratic Representative Committee for the 101 Representative District appointed Flider to the vacancy created by the resignation. Flider was sworn into office the same day. The 101st district to which Flider was appointed was at that time was anchored by the City of Decatur and included all or parts of Macon, Moultrie and Shelby counties in Central Illinois.

Over the course of his tenure in the Illinois House of Representatives, his committee assignments included Agriculture & Conservation, Elections & Campaign Reform, Elementary & Secondary Education, Environment & Energy, Ethanol Production Oversight, Veterans Affairs, Local Government and Renewable Energy. He served as the Vice Chairman for the latter two committees. He also served as the chairman for two committees; Least Cost Power Procurement and Electric Generation & Commerce.

Some of the legislation that Flider served as the primary sponsor on that became laws include provisions that extended penalties for driving under the influence to persons driving under the influence of methamphetamine, insured members of the public were able to comment at meetings of the Illinois Commerce Commission, prevented gas and utility services from cutting off an individual’s service if the forecast was to be below freezing in an upcoming period.

In 2004, Flider won election in his own right defeating radio personality Scot England of Sullivan, Illinois by a margin of 53% to 46%. He won by a similar margin in 2006 and was unopposed in 2008. However, in 2010 he was defeated by 599 votes for re-election by Decatur City Council member Adam Brown.

Flider campaigned against an increase in the Illinois income tax during the 2010 election campaign. After losing the election, Flider voted in favor of increasing the Illinois income tax by 67% during the January 2011 lame duck session.  One year later, Flider was appointed by Governor Quinn as director of the Department of Agriculture with a salary of $133,000.

Post-legislative career
After leaving the Illinois House of Representatives, Flider was employed by Partnership for a Connected Illinois as the Director for Broadband Impact beginning in March 2011. On March 1, 2012, Governor Pat Quinn nominated Flider to succeed Thomas F. Jennings as the Director of the Illinois Department of Agriculture. Flider was confirmed by the Illinois Senate in a 33-16 vote. Upon appointment, Flider set three goals for the department: achieve Governor Quinn's goal of doubling Illinois exports by 2014, maximize every opportunity to strengthen rural development in Illinois, and partner with the agriculture community in ongoing efforts to ensure our food is safe. On April 23, 2018, Flider was hired to serve as the Director of Community and Government Relations for the Office of the Chancellor of the University of Illinois Urbana-Champaign.

References

External links
Robert F. Flider official site
Illinois General Assembly - Representative Robert F. Flider (D) 101st District official IL House website
Bills Committees
Project Vote Smart - Representative Robert F. Flider (IL) profile
Follow the Money - Robert (Bob) Flider
2006 2004 campaign contributions
Illinois House Democrats - Robert F. Flider profile

1957 births
Living people
21st-century American politicians
People from Mattoon, Illinois
People from Macon County, Illinois
Eastern Illinois University alumni
Illinois city council members
Mayors of places in Illinois
Democratic Party members of the Illinois House of Representatives